Ivan Nikolov may refer to:
 Ivan Nikolov (basketball), Bulgarian basketball player
 Ivan Nikolov (footballer), Macedonian footballer 
 Ivan Kostov Nikolov, Bulgarian geologist, mineralogist and crystallographer